Mobido Sidibé (born 7 January 1970) is a Malian former footballer who played as a centre-back. He made 20 appearances for the Mali national team from 1993 to 1997. He was also named in Mali's squad for the 1994 African Cup of Nations tournament.

References

External links
 

1970 births
Living people
Malian footballers
Association football central defenders
Mali international footballers
1994 African Cup of Nations players
Place of birth missing (living people)
21st-century Malian people